Greenwater Lake Provincial Park is a provincial park in the Canadian province of Saskatchewan. It is located on the eastern side of the province in the Porcupine Hills on Highway 38. The closest town, Porcupine Plain, is about 28 kilometres to the north-east of the park visitor centre. Founded on 19 February 1932, Greenwater is one of the oldest provincial parks in Saskatchewan. The original six parks were established in 1931 and Greenwater Provincial Park was added one year later. In 1964, the park was expanded to its current size.

The park is centred around two lakes, Greenwater and Marean, in the Porcupine Provincial Forest. The west side of Marean Lake is not within the park but there is a resort there called Marean Lake Valley Resort. The park is also an Important Bird Area (IBA) of Canada (SK 071 Greenwater Lake Provincial Park).

Attractions and amenities
Greenwater Provincial Park is considered a all-season destination as it offers a wide variety of amenities and attraction for both the summer and winter seasons.

Some of the amenities include a marina that offers rentals and moorage, a volleyball net, laundry, hiking, picnicking, a tennis court, a horseshoe area, an 18-hole golf course, mini-golf, a fish cleaning station, a baseball diamond, children's playgrounds, camping, cabin rentals, and a beach. There is also a hall available for events and a store with groceries, clothing, souvenirs, and an arcade.

There are about 125 kilometres of trails throughout the park. In the summer months, they're great for hiking, walking, and bird watching. In the winter months, the trails are groomed for cross-country skiing and snowmobiling. The winter also features ice skating and tobogganing.

Restaurants in the park include the Greenwater Beach Cafe and an indoor restaurant called Greenwater Fisherman's Cove.

Fuels such as diesel, gasoline, propane, marine fuel, and firewood are available in the park.

Camping and cabins
Greenwater Provincial Park has over 300 individual campsites divided into five campgrounds, including Aspen Grove, Poplar Ridge, Hilltop, Cranberry, and Lakeshore Campgrounds. As the name suggests, Lakeshore Campground is right on Greenwater Lake. Hilltop is the largest with 87 sites and Aspen is the smallest with 12. The campgrounds all have access to fire pits, picnic tables, potable water, waste disposal, showers, and flush toilets.

The park also has 28 cabins for rent, 18 of which are winterised.

Green Hills Golf Resort
Green Hills Golf Resort is an 18-hole golf course in Greenwater Lake Provincial Park. It is a championship par 72 course with a total length of 6,717 yards. It features silica sand traps, water hazards in play, and manicured fairways with hilltop views. Rating from blue tees 72.9, slope 128.

Greenwater Lake Marina
On the south shore of the lake is Greenwater Lake Marina. The marina offers moorage and marine gas as well as pontoon boat, fishing boat, canoe, kayak, and paddle boat rentals. At the store at the marina, there's fishing gear, such as rods and nets for sale or rent as well as various bait, including leeches, nightcrawlers, and frozen minnows. Safety equipment, such as life jackets, is available as well.

Summer and winter trails
During the spring, summer, and autumn, the 125 km of trails are open for hiking and exploring. There are two interpretive trails, Marean Lake Birding and Highbush, that are ideal for birdwatching as the park is home to more than 200 bird species, some of which include the Trumpeter Swan, bald eagle, common yellowthroat, yellow-bellied sapsucker, osprey, and red-breasted merganser. Both trails include look out points, including a 5.5 metre high lookout tower on Marean Lake, rest areas, and interpretive signs.

In the winter, 25 km of trails are groomed for cross-country skiing and 100 km for snowmobiling. There are several warm-up shelters along the trails.

Sask Aquatic Adventures 
At the beach, Sask Aquatic Adventures has a water adventure park set up. It is one of nine in Saskatchewan. The others are located at Blackstrap Lake, the Battlefords, Buffalo Pound, Duck Mountain, Regina Beach, Tufts Bay on Lake Diefenbaker by Elbow, Sandy Bay at Candle Lake Provincial Park, and Greig Lake at Meadow Lake Provincial Park.

Flora and fauna
The park is situated in the Porcupine Provincial Forest in east central Saskatchewan. The landscape is made up of rolling hills dotted with small lakes and covered with spruce, balsam poplar, and aspen trees. It is home to over 200 species of birds and a variety of wildlife including foxes, otters, coyotes, moose, black bears, and elk. Fish such as are northern pike, walleye, and yellow perch inhabit the lakes.

See also
List of protected areas of Saskatchewan
Tourism in Saskatchewan

References 

Provincial parks of Saskatchewan
Division No. 14, Saskatchewan
Important Bird Areas of Saskatchewan